The Central American red brocket (Mazama temama) is a species of brocket deer ranging from southern Mexico, through Central America, to northwestern Colombia.

Taxonomy 
In 1792 Robert Kerr originally described it as a unique separate species as opposed to a subspecies. It was treated as a subspecies of the red brocket (Mazama americana) from South America, but its karyotype has 2n = 50, while the latter's was initially described as having 2n = 68–70. However, a more recent description gives the red brocket a variable karyotype with 2n ranging from 48 to 54, suggesting it represents several species. It is sympatric with the Yucatan brown brocket (Odocoileus pandora) over part of its range. Additionally, it was estimated that Mazama temama diverged from other red brocket deer about 2 MYA. This was estimated through analysis of concatenated sequences from the mitochondrial gene ND2, Cytb, and tRNA-Pro-Control region.

Habitat 
The species is found in primary and secondary tropical forest at altitudes from sea level to 2800 m.

Conservation 
In Mexico, it is regarded as an agricultural pest by bean farmers. It is probably threatened by hunting and deforestation. Due to not much being known about the species, it is rated as Data Deficient on the IUCN Red List.

References

Ungulates of Central America
Mazama (genus)
Mammals described in 1792